The Swan Island Shipyard was a shipyard on Swan Island in Portland, Oregon, United States. It was constructed by the industrialist Henry J. Kaiser in 1942 as part of the U.S. Maritime Commission's Emergency Shipbuilding Program in World War II. The Swan Island yard was one of three Kaiser Shipyards in the Portland area (all within a 4 mile radius), along with the Oregon Shipbuilding Corporation and the Vancouver Shipyard.

Before the opening of the shipyard, Swan Island was the location of the Swan Island Municipal Airport. The Port of Portland leased the airport to the U.S. federal government in March 1942. The completed Swan Island yard began production in July 1942 with eight shipways. The Swan Island Shipyard was one of four shipyards in the United States specifically designed to produce T2 tankers. It produced 153 tankers over the course of the war, all of them of the T2-SE-A1 design.

References

External links
 

1942 establishments in Oregon
Shipyards of the United States

United States home front during World War II